Christopher Jon Marinucci (born December 29, 1971) is an American former professional ice hockey player who played briefly in the NHL with the Los Angeles Kings and the New York Islanders. He also played with the Denver Grizzlies, Utah Grizzlies, Phoenix Roadrunners,  Chicago Wolves, Kokudo Tokyo,  Eisbären Berlin, Idaho Steelheads, IF Björklöven and Storhamar Dragons.

At the start of his career, he first played four years with his University of Minnesota Duluth hockey team, earning conference MVP and the Hobey Baker award as college hockey's top player. He then was drafted in 1990 by the New York Islanders and played in the IHL with the Denver Grizzlies and made his debut in the NHL that year. He then moved on to different leagues, including DEL, the Japan and Sweden leagues, and the WCHL and the ECHL. However, he played most of his career with several teams in the IHL. In a 14-year span (1990–2004) he won 3 awards, and his last season was with the Idaho Steelheads in the ECHL. He was part of the cup winning Storhamar Dragons of the Norwegian Elite League 2004, after scoring the game winner of game six in overtime in dramatic fashion as he set up the decisive game seven where the Dragons beat Vålerenga Ishockey in double overtime.

Career statistics

Regular season and playoffs

International

Awards and honors

Ken McKenzie Trophy - 1994–95
IHL Man of the Year - 1998–99

External links

1971 births
American expatriate sportspeople in Norway
American men's ice hockey centers
Chicago Wolves (IHL) players
Denver Grizzlies players
Eisbären Berlin players
Hobey Baker Award winners
Ice hockey players from Minnesota
Sportspeople from Grand Rapids, Minnesota
Idaho Steelheads (WCHL) players
IF Björklöven players
Kokudo Keikaku players
Living people
Los Angeles Kings players
Minnesota Duluth Bulldogs men's ice hockey players
New York Islanders draft picks
New York Islanders players
Phoenix Roadrunners (IHL) players
Storhamar Dragons players
Utah Grizzlies (IHL) players
AHCA Division I men's ice hockey All-Americans